Hymenoxys cooperi is a species of flowering plant in the daisy family known by the common name Cooper's rubberweed. It is native to the southwestern United States and Great Basin, where it grows in rocky soils in arid regions from southern California to New Mexico, north as far as Idaho and Oregon.

Hymenoxys cooperi is a biennial or perennial herb with a branching stem growing erect to heights between 15 and 90 centimeters (6-36 inches or 0.5-3.0 feet). It produces narrow, pointed leaves with two lateral lobes that form a trident shape. The foliage and stem are glandular and waxy, usually with a thin coat of light-colored hairs. The daisy-like flower head is a cup of fused phyllaries with 30–150 tiny yellow-orange disc florets surrounded by 9–14 bright yellow ray florets, each ray about a centimeter (0.4 inches) long.

References

External links
Jepson Manual Treatment, University of California
United States Department of Agriculture Plants Profile
Calphotos Photo gallery, University of California
Photo of herbarium specimen at Missouri Botanical Garden, collected in Utah or Arizona in 1877

cooperi
Flora of the Western United States
Plants described in 1861
Flora without expected TNC conservation status